Harold Hewitt may refer to:
 Harold Hewitt (rowing)
 Harold Hewitt (trade unionist)